Bowman Heights is a neighborhood within the district of 
West Tampa, which represents District 6 of the Tampa City Council. Demographically, The neighborhood did not report separately.

Geography
Bowman Heights is located at latitude 27.968 north and longitude 82.479 west. The elevation is 20 feet above sea level. 
Bowman Heights' boundaries include the Hillsborough River to the east, Howard Avenue to the west, and Columbus Drive to the north.

See also
West Tampa
Neighborhoods in Tampa, Florida

References

External links
Bowman Heights; from Neighborhood Link
Information from Hometown Locator

Neighborhoods in Tampa, Florida